Angelo Carosi (born 20 January 1964 in Priverno) is an Italian long-distance runner who specialized in the 3000 metres steeplechase. In his later career he also took up half marathon and marathon.

Biography
He ran four times consecutively in the 3000 meters steeplechase at the IAAF World Championships in Athletics (1991, 1993, 1995, 1997). Carosi won three medals, at senior level, at the International athletics competitions. He participated at one edition of the Summer Olympics (1996), he has 29 caps in national team from 1989 to 2000.

Achievements

Marathons

National titles
He won eight individual titles in his career at the Italian Athletics Championships. Spanning 15 years, he won his first national title 1989 and his last in 2004 at 40 years old.
3 wins in the 3000 metres steeplechase (1989, 1991, 2004)
2 wins in the 5000 metres (1994, 1998)
2 wins in the marathon (2001, 2003)
1 win in the 3000 metres indoor (1990)

See also
 World records in masters athletics - 3000 metres steeplechase
 List of Italian records in masters athletics
 Italian all-time lists - 3000 metres steeplechase

References

External links
 

1964 births
Living people
Italian male long-distance runners
Italian male steeplechase runners
Italian male marathon runners
Italian masters athletes
Olympic athletes of Italy
Athletes (track and field) at the 1996 Summer Olympics
World Athletics Championships athletes for Italy
European Athletics Championships medalists
World record holders in masters athletics
Athletics competitors of Gruppo Sportivo Forestale